Euphoria is an American teen drama television series created and principally written by Sam Levinson for HBO and based on the Israeli miniseries of the same name created by Ron Leshem and Daphna Levin. The series' main character is Rue Bennett (Zendaya), a recovering teenage drug addict who struggles to find her place in the world.

Euphorias executive producers include Levinson, Zendaya, Ron Leshem, and Gary Lennon. The series is filmed at Ulysses S. Grant High School in Los Angeles, California, Sony Pictures Studios in Culver City, California, and Warner Bros. Studios in Burbank, California. Outside California, it is filmed in New York City, Singapore, and Warner Bros. Studios in Leavesden, Hertfordshire. The series has received generally positive reviews, with praise for its cinematography, score, performances of the cast (particularly Zendaya, Schafer, Sweeney and Domingo), and approach to its mature subject matter. It has also been a subject of controversy for its nudity and sexual content, which critics found excessive due to the teenage setting. It is the fourth most-watched series in HBO history, behind Game of Thrones, The Last of Us, and House of the Dragon.

Euphoria premiered on June 16, 2019. The series was renewed for a second season in July 2019. Two one-hour specials were broadcast in December 2020 and January 2021. The second season premiered on January 9, 2022, and in February 2022 the series was renewed for a third season. The series has received numerous accolades, including a nomination for the Primetime Emmy Award for Outstanding Drama Series. For her performance, Zendaya has won two Primetime Emmy Awards, a Critics' Choice Television Award, and a Golden Globe Award for Best Actress. Sydney Sweeney, Colman Domingo, and Martha Kelly have also received Emmy nominations for their acting, with Domingo winning Outstanding Guest Actor in a Drama Series.

Premise
Euphoria follows teenagers in the fictional town of East Highland, California, who seek hope while balancing the strains of love, loss, and addiction. Topics such as child abuse, drug abuse, toxic relationships, toxic positivity, hookup culture, social media, mental illness, codependency, infidelity, relapsing, repressed homosexuality, sobriety, human trafficking, domestic violence, rape, sexual assault, toxic masculinity, drug dealing, dating violence and grief are explored.

Cast and characters 

 Zendaya as Ruby "Rue" Bennett, a teenage drug addict who is fresh out of rehab and struggling to find her place in the world. She serves as the show's narrator.
 Maude Apatow as Alexandra "Lexi" Howard, Rue's childhood best friend and Cassie's younger sister.
 Angus Cloud as Fezco "Fez" O’Neill, a local drug dealer with a close relationship to Rue.
 Eric Dane as Cal Jacobs, Nate's strict, demanding father with a dangerous double life.
 Alexa Demie as Madeleine "Maddy" Perez, a popular student and Nate's on-and-off girlfriend.
 Jacob Elordi as Nathaniel "Nate" Jacobs, a high school athlete whose anger issues mask his sexual insecurities.
 Barbie Ferreira as Katherine "Kat" Hernandez (seasons 1–2), a girl fighting for body positivity while exploring her sexuality.
 Nika King as Leslie Bennett, Rue and Gia's mother.
 Storm Reid as Georgia "Gia" Bennett, Rue's younger sister.
 Hunter Schafer as Jules Vaughn, a transgender girl who enters a turbulent relationship with Rue after moving to East Highland.
 Algee Smith as Christopher "Chris" McKay (season 1; guest season 2), a young football player and Cassie's ex-boyfriend who has difficulties adjusting to college.
 Sydney Sweeney as Cassandra "Cassie" Howard, Lexi's older sister and McKay's ex-girlfriend with an infamous sexual history that continues to haunt her.
 Colman Domingo as Ali Muhammed ("Trouble Don't Last Always"; recurring seasons 1–2), a man in recovery from drug addiction who often speaks at Rue's Narcotics Anonymous meetings and eventually becomes her sponsor.
 Javon "Wanna" Walton as Ashtray O’Neill (season 2; recurring season 1), Fez's unofficially adopted "little brother" and a drug dealer
 Austin Abrams as Ethan Daley (season 2; recurring season 1), Kat's love interest.
 Dominic Fike as Elliot (season 2–present), a new "friend" of Rue's, who comes between her and Jules.

Episodes

Season 1 (2019)

Specials (2020–21)

Season 2 (2022)

Production

Conception 

In 2006, Sam Levinson began drafting different versions of what eventually became Euphoria, based on his experience with drugs as a teenager. He was invited to a meeting with HBO about an adaptation of the 2012 Israeli television series Euphoria created by Ron Leshem, Daphna Levin, and Tamira Yardeni. In 2019, Levinson said HBO's head of drama, Francesca Orsi, liked the "raw and honest" portrayal of drug use and other teenage problems in the Israeli series. In a press release, Orsi described the series as "Kids meets Trainspotting" with no parental supervision.

The concept for Euphoria was based on Levinson's personal experiences as a teenager and his struggles with anxiety, depression, and drug addiction. In a meeting with Orsi, he recalled: "We just had a conversation about just life and her life and my life and various struggles that, you know, we've been through and things and she said, 'Great, you know, well go and write that' and I said 'What?' and she goes 'Everything we just talked about'". Levinson has also cited teenage anxiety as a whole as an influence for the series: "There is this consistent anxiety that I think exists in this generation that I think informed the whole filmmaking process."

In June 2017, it was reported that the series was in development at HBO.

Production team 
Euphoria is a co-production of The Reasonable Bunch, A24, Little Lamb, DreamCrew, and HBO Entertainment. It has 16 executive producers, including Levinson, Leshem, Levin, Yardeni, Hadas Mozes Lichtenstein, Mirit Toovi, Yoram Mokadi, Gary Lennon, Zendaya, Canadian rapper Drake, Future the Prince, Ravi Nandan, and Kevin Turen. The pilot episode, "Pilot", was directed by Augustine Frizzell.

Levinson has served as Euphorias showrunner since its premiere, and has written every episode. He has directed every episode except the Pilot and the season one episodes "03 Bonnie and Clyde" and "The Next Episode", which were directed by Jennifer Morrison and Pippa Bianco. Zendaya will probably direct the third season's episode.

The production was given a pilot order on March 13, 2018, and on July 30, it was announced that HBO had given the production a series order. The series was renewed for a second season on July 11, 2019.

Out of respect for the actors and extras involved, filming of nudity was conducted on a closed set, and for sex scenes, an intimacy coordinator was used.

Production for season two was scheduled to start in the second quarter of 2020, with the first table read on March 11, but the COVID-19 pandemic delayed the production. Production resumed in March 2021, with filming from April to November.

Before the series' second season, HBO ordered two specials. The first, "Trouble Don't Last Always", premiered on December 6, 2020, and follows Rue as she deals with the aftermath of leaving Jules at the train station and relapsing. The second, "Fuck Anyone Who's Not a Sea Blob", premiered on January 24, 2021, and follows Jules's side of the story. The second episode was co-written and executive produced by Levinson and Hunter Schafer. HBO announced that the special episodes would air two days early on HBO Max.

On February 4, 2022, HBO renewed the series for a third season. In September 2022, HBO's CEO Casey Bloys said the series could go beyond four seasons, and would not end after season three. Production of season three started in February 2023, aiming for a late 2023 release, but according to a Vogue interview with Apatow, filming is set to start in the second half of 2023.

Casting 

In June 2018, it was announced that the pilot would star Zendaya, Storm Reid, Maude Apatow, Astro, Eric Dane, Angus Cloud, Alexa Demie, Jacob Elordi, Barbie Ferreira, Nika King, Hunter Schafer, and Sydney Sweeney. In October, Algee Smith was cast to replace Astro as McKay, and that Austin Abrams had also been cast. Astro reportedly quit the series after shooting the pilot as he was uncomfortable with the sexual content involving his character.

In April 2020, Kelvin Harrison Jr. joined the cast, but by May 2021, he had dropped out due to scheduling conflicts as a result of the COVID-19 pandemic. In August, Dominic Fike, Minka Kelly, and Demetrius 'Lil Meech' Flenory Jr. were added to the cast. On February 22, 2022, it was announced that Smith had quit the series after starring in two episodes of season 2. On August 24, 2022, Ferreira announced via Instagram story that she had decided to leave the series.

Filming locations and style 

Primary photography takes place in Sony Pictures Studios in Culver City, California. Ulysses S. Grant High School in Los Angeles stands in for the fictional East Highland High School. According to the California Film Commission, the first season of Euphoria received $8,378,000 in incentive tax credits. The first season was filmed over a combined total of 104 days; the second season's production costs totaled $96,685,000 after a total of 176 filming days. Subsequently, the second season received a $19,406,000 tax credit for employing over 15,000 people in California. Zendaya received $500,000 per episode in the first two seasons and will receive $1,000,000 per episode in the third season.

For season one, the show was shot digitally. Starting with season two, the show was shot on Kodak Ektachrome film stock, which cinematographer Marcell Rév attributed to a desire to invoke "some sort of memory of high school."

For season three, Rue's sobriety journey, Zendaya opened up about exploring characters outside high school, with the filming locations of New York City, Singapore, and Warner Bros. Studios lots in Burbank and Leavesden.

Episode titles 
Many of the episode titles for season one are references to late-1990s and early-2000s song titles that correlate to the episode itself. For instance, "'03 Bonnie and Clyde" is a reference to the 2002 Jay-Z and Beyoncé song of the same name. The loyal relationship between Nate Jacobs and Maddy Perez in the episode mirrors that between Jay-Z and Beyoncé in the song. For season two, many of the episode titles are references to books and quotes.

Release
The series premiered on June 16, 2019, on HBO. In Southeast Asia, Hong Kong, and Taiwan, it premiered on June 17, 2019, through HBO Asia. In Australia, it premiered on June 17, 2019, through Foxtel. In the United Kingdom and the Republic of Ireland, it premiered on August 6, 2019, through Sky Atlantic. The specials were released on December 6, 2020 (as Part 1: Rue) and January 24, 2021 (as Part 2: Jules). The second season premiered on January 9, 2022.

Like many HBO series,  Euphoria is extensively pirated in the United Kingdom.

Home media 
The first and second seasons (including the two special episodes) were released on DVD on November 1, 2022, by Warner Bros. Home Entertainment.

Reception

Critical response

Season 1

Euphorias first season was met with a positive response from critics, with much of its praise going to its acting, story, visuals, and approach to mature subject matter. On the review aggregator website Rotten Tomatoes, the first season has an approval rating of 80%, with an average rating of 7.4/10 based on 100 critical reviews. The site's critical consensus summary states, "a uniquely challenging and illuminating series, held together by a powerfully understated performance from Zendaya" The review aggregator website Metacritic, which uses a weighted average, assigned a score of 68 out of 100, based on 26 critics, indicating "generally favorable reviews". Ben Travers of IndieWire praised the show's authenticity, how HBO "grounds itself in stark reality", and Zendaya's performance and narration. Tim Goodman of The Hollywood Reporter noted Zendaya's performance and the handling of the subject matter. Pilot Viruet of Observer called the show "visually stunning" and praised the ensemble's performance, but criticized the writing as "shaky, filled with clunky lines", and recommended that the show "keep its focus narrow". Jamila Stewart of Vogue stated that Euphoria still has a palpable impact on where fashion trends fall today.

Specials
The first of the series' two special episodes, "Trouble Don't Last Always", received widespread critical acclaim for its writing, performances, and shift in tone and content from the first season. On Rotten Tomatoes, the episode has a score of 97%, with an average rating of 8.44/10 based on 23 critical reviews. The website's critical consensus reads, "Euphoria slows down the tempo without losing the beat in a special episode that pairs a raw Zendaya with a steady Colman Domingo to create small screen magic." On Metacritic, the episode has a weighted average score of 84 out of 100, based on 10 reviews, indicating "universal acclaim".

The second of the two special episodes, "Fuck Anyone Who's Not a Sea Blob", also received critical acclaim, with particular praise for Schafer's performance and writing, as well as the episode's distinctive directorial approach, emotional resonance, and exploration of trans identity. On Rotten Tomatoes, it has a score of 96%, with an average rating of 7.9/10 based on 22 critical reviews. The site's critical consensus reads, "By centering on Jules' journey, Fuck Anyone Who's Not a Sea Blob adds welcome depth to her character and gives Hunter Schafer plenty of room to shine." On Metacritic, the episode has an average weighted score of 78 out of 100, based on 10 reviews, indicating "generally favorable reviews".

Season 2

The series' second season received mostly positive reviews, with critics praising the performances and visuals but criticizing the season's pace and characterization. On Rotten Tomatoes, the second season received a "Certified Fresh" score of 81%, with an average rating of 7.05/10 based on 110 reviews. The site's critical consensus reads, "As willfully provocative as ever in its second season, Euphoria still isn't for all tastes—but when its addictive ingredients are mixed just right, the results remain intoxicating." Metacritic assigned the season a score of 74 out of 100 based on 19 reviews, indicating "generally favorable reviews". IndieWire's Ben Travers criticized the sexual content but appreciated Zendaya's performance, writing, "After seven of the eight episodes, Season 2 is exactly what a drama seeking to spark conversation fears most: It's skippable." Rebecca Nicholson for The Guardian gave the second season two out of five stars, writing, "this long-awaited second season has decided to lean into its crueller instincts." USA Today's Patrick Ryan praised the performances of Zendaya, Schafer, and Fike, but wrote that "the new episodes are much less captivating when they shift their focus away from Rue and Jules."

Ratings 
The series' premiere averaged 577,000 viewers in its time slot, a number that increased to one million after the same-night linear replay and preliminary viewing on HBO Go/Now. The hashtag #EuphoriaHBO trended number one in the U.S. and number three worldwide on Twitter after the premiere. The first season was the most watched of HBO's series in the 18–49 demographic with episodes averaging 6.6 million viewers. The season 2 premiere drew 2.4 million viewers across all HBO platforms, a series high. It also marked the strongest digital premiere night performance for any episode of an HBO series since HBO Max's launch, until it was dethroned by House of the Dragon and The Last of Us. At the end of its second season, it became the second-most-watched HBO series of all time (behind Game of Thrones), with episodes averaging 16.3 million viewers until it was surpassed by House of the Dragon and The Last of Us. According to Variety, Euphoria became the most tweeted television series of the decade in the U.S., with more than 30 million tweets related to the series during the second season, 51% more than during Season 1.

Season 1

Specials

Season 2

Accolades

Concerns over depiction of sex and drugs
Some commentators and organizations have criticized the series' explicit content, including self-harm, excessive drug use, and sexual material. The conservative media advocacy group Parents Television and Media Council called the series "dark, depraved, degenerate and nihilistic", and asked HBO and AT&T to end it. Common Sense Media, which provides information on media's suitability for children, also noted the strong adult themes and advised against teenage viewership. One scene involving more than 30 shots of penises was criticized by both critics and supporters, with Esquire calling it "pointlessly gratuitous". The Guardian wrote that writers and producers should find new and different ways to shock audiences. In 2022, Minka Kelly said she felt discomfort at the quantity of nude scenes in the series. Drug Abuse Resistance Education criticized the series' depiction of drug use, saying that it "chooses to misguidedly glorify and erroneously depict high school student drug use addiction ... and other destructive behaviors as common in today’s world”. Samuel Getachew wrote in a Culture piece for Vogue that the series' depictions of trauma aestheticizes it in a way that his "generation is particularly vulnerable to". HBO defended the series against the Season 2 shoot allegations, writing: "The well-being of cast and crew on our productions is always a top priority. The production was in full compliance with all safety guidelines and guild protocols. It’s not uncommon for drama series to have complex shoots, and COVID protocols add an additional layer. We maintain an open line of communication with all the guilds, including SAG-AFTRA. There were never any formal inquiries raised."

Criticism
Levinson acknowledged the controversies over the series' content, saying that some parents will be "totally fucking freaked out". Augustine Frizzell, who directed the series' pilot episode, said that the explicit content should help foster a conversation between parents and teenagers. Levinson also said that he hopes the series "opens up a dialogue" due to the "disconnect between parents and teenagers". Zendaya issued a warning both before the series and season 2 premiere about its "deeply emotional subject matter". HBO voiced objections to some sexually graphic scenes, but said it would not interfere with the series' "creative process". The series includes viewer discretion warnings and a website for mental health and other support group resources. The series has reportedly been censored for sexual or violent content in countries like Malaysia, the Philippines, Singapore, and Vietnam.

Music

Euphorias score was composed by English singer, songwriter, and record producer Labrinth. The song "All for Us", performed by Labrinth and Zendaya, is hinted at throughout season 1 before being performed as a large musical number at the end of the season finale. Labrinth makes an appearance in the series alongside Zendaya to perform their song "I'm Tired".

The series also makes extensive use of popular music, including hip hop, trap, R&B, experimental, indie rock, standards and doo-wop, with some episodes featuring over 20 songs. For their work on Euphorias first season, music supervisors Jen Malone (who also supervises the FX series Atlanta) and Adam Leber won the 2020 Guild of Music Supervisors Award for Best Music Supervision in a Television Drama.

Scores 

The score album for the first season was released by Sony Masterworks through Milan Records on October 4, 2019, for digital download. The album was also released on vinyl on January 10, 2020. The score has been described as "the holy lilt of gospel, orchestral and electronic" and was favorably reviewed by Variety.

The score album for the second season was released by Columbia Records on April 22, 2022, in digital and physical formats. Like the previous one, it was composed and produced by Labrinth.

Soundtracks

Season 1 soundtrack 

A soundtrack album featuring a selection of songs from the first season and specials was released by Interscope Records digitally on May 14, 2021, with vinyl copies released on September 3, 2021.

Season 2 soundtrack 

The soundtrack to season 2 was released digitally by Interscope Records on March 4, 2022, with CDs releasing on May 13, 2022, and vinyl on July 29, 2022. The album's release was preceded by seven singles, "Watercolor Eyes" by Lana Del Rey, "How Long" by Tove Lo, "(Pick Me Up) Euphoria" by James Blake featuring Labrinth, "Sad4Whattt" by EricDoa, "Yeh I Fuckin' Did it" by Labrinth, "I'm Tired" by Labrinth and Zendaya, and "Elliot's Song" by Dominic Fike and Zendaya.

In an interview with IndieWire, Labrinth stated of the soundtrack's religious undertones: "We spoke about using organs because of a lot of the religious influences in the show, especially with Rue. We wanted a lot of the sounds edging towards a religious sound. And because I love both Pentecostal and Catholic sounds, I kind of was like trying to merge them both together."

Notes

References

External links
 
 
 
 Official screenplay for "Stand Still Like the Hummingbird"

2010s American high school television series
2010s American LGBT-related drama television series
2010s American teen drama television series
2019 American television series debuts
2020s American LGBT-related drama television series
2020s American teen drama television series
American television series based on Israeli television series
Bipolar disorder in fiction
Bisexuality-related television series
Coming-of-age television shows
English-language television shows
Euphoria (TV series)
HBO original programming
Nudity in television
Obscenity controversies in television
Primetime Emmy Award-winning television series
Psychological drama television and other works
Serial drama television series
Television about mental health
Television controversies in the United States
Television productions suspended due to the COVID-19 pandemic
Television series about social media
Television series about teenagers
Television series by A24
Television series by Home Box Office
Television shows about drugs
Television shows filmed in California
Television shows filmed in Los Angeles
Television shows filmed in New York City
Television shows filmed in Singapore
Transgender-related television shows
Works about addiction
Works about sexual abuse
Youth culture in the United States